is a ball-shaped Japanese snack made of a wheat flour-based batter and cooked in a special molded pan. It is typically filled with minced or diced octopus (tako), tempura scraps (tenkasu), pickled ginger (beni shoga), and green onion (negi). The balls are brushed with takoyaki sauce (similar to Worcestershire sauce) and mayonnaise, and then sprinkled with green laver (aonori) and shavings of dried bonito (katsuobushi).

Typically, it is eaten as a snack or between meals, but in some areas it is served as a side dish with rice.

History
Takoyaki was first popularized in Osaka, where a street vendor named Tomekichi Endo is credited with its invention in 1935. Takoyaki was inspired by akashiyaki, a small round dumpling from the city of Akashi in Hyōgo Prefecture made of an egg-rich batter and octopus. Takoyaki was initially popular in the Kansai region, and later spread to the Kantō region and other areas of Japan. Takoyaki is associated with yatai street food stalls, and there are many well-established takoyaki specialty restaurants, particularly in the Kansai region. Takoyaki is now sold at commercial outlets, such as supermarkets and 24-hour convenience stores.

It is also very popular in Taiwanese cuisine due to the historical influence of Japanese culture.

The oldest known takoyaki store is Aizuya in Osaka. Founded by Tomakichi Endo, it has been open since the 1930s. The first takoyaki included beef and konjac, but later Endo switched to using the now traditional octopus and added flavor to the batter. The takoyaki are then eaten with brown sauce, similar to Worcestershire sauce. In recent years, takoyaki can be eaten with various toppings and fillings (such as cheese or bacon) as its cultural span has evolved in western parts of the world. The food, known as "octopus balls", quickly became popular throughout Japan.

Takoyaki pan
A  or—much more rarely— is typically a griddle made of cast iron with hemispherical molds. The heavy iron evenly heats the takoyaki, which are turned with a pick during the heating process to pull the uncooked batter to the base of the rounded cavity. Commercial gas-fueled takoyaki cookers are used at Japanese festivals or by street vendors. For home use, electric versions resemble a hotplate; stovetop versions are also available, and many incorporate a non-stick coating to facilitate turning.

In popular culture

Takoyaki is the favorite food of Taruruto, the title character of the 1988 manga series Magical Taruruto. The food also serves as the many collectibles in several tie-in video games.

A children's book named Takoyaki Mantoman, published in the 1990s and later adapted into an anime television series produced by Studio Pierrot that aired from April 1998 to September 1999, focuses on a group of takoyaki fighting crime. 

In the Animal Crossing series of video games, there is a villager that comes up in multiple versions of the game. This villager is named Zucker and is based on takoyaki. 

Takoyaki was featured on the Netflix Television series, Street Food, in the Osaka, Japan episode.

In the video game Yakuza 0, Goro Majima attempts to cheer up Makoto Makimura by bringing her some takoyaki made by a street vendor in the fictional Osaka area of Sotenbori.

An Internet meme originating from the Philippines showcases a variation of the food in a viral video with the phrase, "Nakatikim ka na ba ng tig-dalawang pisong takoyaki?", meaning "Have you ever tried the "two-peso takoyaki"?". Even though the food showcased in the video does not contain any octopus, the uploader continues to describe it as such thus resulting into many variations of the meme.

Image gallery

See also 

 List of seafood dishes

 Similar global dishes
 Æbleskiver in Denmark
 Cekodok in Malaysia
 Poffertjes in Netherlands
 Kue cucur in Indonesia
 Kuzhi paniyaram (plain or spicy but vegan), unniyappam and neyyappam (both sweet dishes) in India

References

External links 

 Making Classic Takoyaki at Home A DIY Takoyaki recipe.

Street food
Octopus dishes
Japanese cuisine
Japanese food preparation utensils
Street food in South Korea